Isbrueckerichthys alipionis is a species of armored catfish endemic to Brazil where it occurs in the Ribeira de Iguape River basin.  This species grows to a length of  SL.

The fish's name was derived from Brazilian ichthyologist-herpetologist Alipio de Miranda Ribeiro (1874-1939).

References 
 

Loricariidae
Catfish of South America
Fish of Brazil
Endemic fauna of Brazil
Taxa named by William Alonzo Gosline III
Fish described in 1947